The Chinese Ambassador to Finland is the official representative of the People's Republic of China to Finland.

List of representatives

See also
China–Finland relations

References 

Ambassadors of China to Finland
Finland
China